Beautiful Memories is a 2001 French film directed by Zabou Breitman. It won the César Awards for Best First Feature Film, Best Actress and Best Supporting Actor, and was nominated for Best Actor. Also, the French Syndicate of Cinema Critics named it best debut film.

Plot
Claire Poussin, a young woman in her early 30s whose mother has recently died from Alzheimer's, has been having memory loss problems since being struck by lightning. She believes she is showing the first signs of the disease, but her sister Nathalie thinks the problem is temporary. Claire seeks help by entering a clinic for people with memory-loss problems, which is located in a big country house and run by Prof. Christian Licht. Prof. Licht is having an affair with therapist Marie Bjorg, which he thinks is hidden from his patients, but isn't. At the clinic, Claire meets Philippe, a noted wine expert who is traumatized following a car accident which killed his wife and child, and they fall in love. When both of them are released, they move in together, but find that their condition severely affects their lives. Philippe recovers his memory, and is pained when he remembers the tragic accident, while Claire's condition becomes worse.

Cast
Isabelle Carré as Claire Poussin
Bernard Campan as Philippe
Bernard Le Coq as Prof. Christian Licht
Zabou Breitman as Marie Bjorg
Anne Le Ny as Nathalie Poussin
Dominique Pinon as Robert 
Aude Briant as Corinne 
Denys Granier-Deferre as Toto 
François Levantal as Daniel 
Jean-Claude Deret as Léo Finkel 
Céline Léger as Sarah
Julien Courbey as Stéphane
Guilaine Londez as Isabelle

Accolades

References

External links
 

2001 films
French drama films
Films featuring a Best Actress César Award-winning performance
Films featuring a Best Supporting Actor César Award-winning performance
Films featuring a Best Actress Lumières Award-winning performance
Best First Feature Film César Award winners
Films about Alzheimer's disease
Films directed by Zabou Breitman
2001 directorial debut films
2000s French-language films
2000s French films
Films about disability